Fassade (English: Facade) is the seventh album by German duo Lacrimosa released on 1 October 2001 by Hall of Sermon and Nuclear Blast.

Themes
Whereas the previous album, Elodia, centered on love, Fassades theme is that of a lonely individual feeling overwhelmed by society, exemplified by the central song, Fassade, divided into three Sätze (movements), and the album's artwork. There are also sounds between symphonic gothic metal and funeral doom metal rhythms and patterns, as seen in Fassades different parts.

The album's cover shows a crowd of men and women identically dressed in what can be assumed to be grey (the album's cover is in greyscale), emotionlessly watching three women wearing gothic lingerie parade down a catwalk. Every single individual in the audience has his or her head wired to the person next to them, implying that they are all part of a hivemind. The only person present other than the models and the audience is Lacrimosa's trademark clown, standing in a side door. The back of the album's cover shows that the back wall of the theater has fallen away, revealing nothing but fog and the top of a skyscraper.

Reception

Fassade received positive reviews from the Canadian Exclaim! magazine as well as from the German Sonic Seducer. Exclaim! noted that the German vocals added to the overall "doom and gloom atmosphere" but was reluctant about the fact that all songs seemingly end too abruptly. The Seducer marked a surprisingly intense singing by Tilo Wolff and concluded that both singers Wolff and Nurmi would demand much attention from the listener.

Track listing

Personnel
 Arranged By, Orchestrated By, Producer – Tilo Wolff
 Mastered By – Helge Halvé
 Orchestra – Deutsches Filmorchester Babelsberg 
 Recorded By [Recordings Deutsches Filmorchester Babelsberg] – Michael Schubert
 Recorded By, Mixed By – JP Genkel
 Text By, Music By – Anne Nurmi (tracks: 3), Tilo Wolff (tracks: 1, 2, 4 to 8)

Charts

References

Lacrimosa (band) albums
2001 albums